Suresh Hariram Advani is an oncologist who pioneered hematopoietic stem cell transplantation in India. Struck by poliomyelitis at the age of 8 years, the wheelchair-using doctor studied at Grant Medical College, Mumbai (where he obtained the MBBS and MD Medicine degrees), following which he worked at Tata Memorial Centre for several years as a medical oncologist. Now he consults at Hinduja Hospital. He gained experience in the  field of bone marrow transplantation from the Fred Hutchinson Cancer Research Center, Seattle, Washington.

Early life and education 
Advani was born on 1 August 1947 in Karachi, British India (now in Pakistan). His family, including his parents, three brothers and three sisters had to shift to India after the partition. His family first resided in Deolali, Nashik and later settled in Mumbai. His father had electrical business.

After having been earlier rejected for his disability, Advani persuaded the authorities for an admission in Grant Medical College, Mumbai, Bombay University. He obtained his medicine degree from there in 1966. After training in internal medicine and haematology-oncology at the JJ Hospital, Grant Medical College in Mumbai, he undertook further training in oncology at Fred Hutchinson Cancer Research Center in Seattle. There he got to work with Nobel laureate Dr E Donnall Thomas, known as the father of bone-marrow transplantation in the USA.check his website www.drsureshadvani.in

Honours 
Recipient of the Rashtriyra Krantiveer Award, Ujjain (2014)
Recipient of the Padma Bhushan award by Government of India (2012)
Recipient of the Dr. B. C. Roy National Award by Medical Council of India (2005)
Awarded Lifetime Achievement in Oncology by Harvard Medical International (2005)
Recipient of the Padma Shri by Government of India (2002)
Recipient of the Dhanvantari award (2002) 
Elected fellow - National Academy of Medical Sciences (1996),
Voted as "Pharma Leaders Indian of the Year – Oncology" at 11th Annual Pharma Leaders Power Brand awards 2018

Hospital Affiliations 
Dr Suresh Advani consults patients at many reputed hospitals all across India and especially in Mumbai. Some of them are:

 Sushrut Hospital & Research Centre, Mumbai
 Jaslok Hospital & Research Centre, Mumbai
 S L Raheja Hospital, Mahim
 Dr L H Hiranandani Hospital Powai, Mumbai
 Nanavati Hospital, Mumbai
 Apollo Hospital, Navi Mumbai

References 

Living people
Recipients of the Padma Shri in medicine
Indian people with disabilities
People with polio
Fellows of the National Academy of Medical Sciences
Recipients of the Padma Bhushan in medicine
Indian oncologists
Medical doctors from Mumbai
20th-century Indian medical doctors
Year of birth missing (living people)
Fred Hutchinson Cancer Research Center people
Scientists with disabilities